Lee Bryan Priester, Jr. (April 15, 1903 – June 11, 1988) was an American track and field athlete who competed in the 1924 Summer Olympics. He was born in Monroe, Louisiana and died in Meridian, Mississippi. In 1924 he was eliminated in the qualification of the javelin throw competition and finished eleventh overall.

References

External links

1903 births
1988 deaths
Sportspeople from Monroe, Louisiana
American male javelin throwers
Olympic track and field athletes of the United States
Athletes (track and field) at the 1924 Summer Olympics